The New York City Independent Film Festival (also known as NYC Independent Film Festival, NYCIndieFF) is an annual film festival held in New York City. It was founded in 2009 by Dennis Cieri and Bonnie Rush. The festival has screened over 1,800 movies from 81 different countries since it began in 2010.

References

External links 
Official website https://www.nycindieff.com/

Experimental film festivals
Film festivals in New York City
Cinema of New York City
 Film
+